Chrysostomos II (October 8, 1920 – September 19, 2010), born Athanassios Kioussis (Αθανάσιος Κιούσης), was the Archbishop of Athens and of all Greece of the Church of the Genuine Orthodox Christians of Greece from 1986 until his death.

1920 births
2010 deaths
20th-century Eastern Orthodox bishops
21st-century Eastern Orthodox bishops
Eastern Orthodox metropolitans
Eastern Orthodox Christians from Greece
Old Calendarism